The Incredible Hulks was a monthly comic book series published in the United Kingdom by Panini Comics as part of their Marvel 'Collector's Edition' line, featuring reprints of Marvel Comics from the United States. It began publication in April 2012, replacing Panini's defunct Fantastic Four Adventures series. The first volume ended in April 2014 after 27 issues, with a second volume beginning the following month. Volume 3 began in August 2016. The series was replaced in 2017.

Each issue typically features three stories, each of which revolves around characters such as The Incredible Hulk, She-Hulk, Red Hulk, Red She-Hulk, Lyra, Skaar and A-Bomb among others.

Format
Each issue of The Incredible Hulks had 76 pages, including a contents page and a letters page. It typically featured 4 pages of advertisements. All ads were for Marvel-related merchandise. The covers were printed on thick cardstock. A typical issue featured reprints of three recent Hulk-related stories per issue. Occasionally, a 100-page special was published with four or five stories. It was cancelled in 2017 and was replaced with Deadpool Unleashed.

Printed material
The Incredible Hulks reprinted material from the following US publications:

 Hulk
 Incredible Hulk
 Indestructible Hulk
 She-Hulks
 Red She-Hulk
 Hulk: Raging Thunder
 Fear Itself
 Totally Awesome Hulk

External links
Panini's Incredible Hulks mini-site
Panini Comic’s home page

References

Marvel UK titles
2012 comics debuts
2017 comics endings
British comics
Defunct British comics